Jakub Krč (born 2 September 1997) is a Slovak footballer who plays as a left back or a midfielder for Sokol Lanžhot.

Club career

FK Senica
Krč made his Fortuna Liga debut for Senica on 10 April 2015 against Žilina.

References

External links
 FK Senica profile 
 
 Futbalnet profile

1997 births
Living people
Slovak footballers
Slovak expatriate footballers
Slovakia youth international footballers
Association football midfielders
FK Senica players
ŠKF Sereď players
FC Spartak Trnava players
TJ Sokol Lanžhot players
Slovak Super Liga players
2. Liga (Slovakia) players
Czech Fourth Division players
Expatriate footballers in the Czech Republic
Slovak expatriate sportspeople in the Czech Republic
Sportspeople from Skalica